Gymnoscelis perpusilla is a moth in the family Geometridae. It was described by Alfred Jefferis Turner in 1942. It is found in Queensland, Australia.

References

Moths described in 1942
perpusilla